Grange, often called Grange in Borrowdale, is a village in Borrowdale in the English Lake District.

Historically part of Cumberland, the village is overlooked by Grange Fell and Castle Crag, which flank either side of the narrow section of Borrowdale in which it sits. Its origins date back to medieval times, when the monks of Furness Abbey built a monastic grange on the site. The double-arched bridge that links the village to the B5289 across the River Derwent was built in 1675. Holy Trinity Church followed in 1861.

Governance
Grange in Borrowdale is within the Copeland UK Parliamentary constituency. Trudy Harrison is the Member of Parliament.

Before Brexit for the European Parliament its residents voted to elect MEP's for the North West England constituency.

For Local Government purposes it is in the Keswick Ward of Allerdale Borough Council and the Keswick Division of Cumbria County Council.

Grange in Borrowdale has its own Parish Council; Borrowdale Parish Council.

See also

Listed buildings in Borrowdale

References

External links

Grange in Borrowdale page from the Visit Cumbria web site

Villages in Cumbria
Allerdale